Spanish Cuba is a contemporary citizens' initiative, launched in 2008 from an idea of José Ramón Morales (Caimito, Cuba, November 5, 1954, Miami - May 28, 2012). It pleads for the re-integration of Cuba to the Spanish kingdom as an overseas territory upon mutual agreement between Cuba and Spain, followed by a referendum to be approved in both nations.

History
José Ramón Morales' blog "Autonomous Community of Cuba, Spain," has received over a million visitors since its inception and has generated bitter controversy in the network. The idea of the reunification of the island of Cuba with Spain is connected with liberal and autonomist ideas that coexisted throughout the nineteenth century with the ideal of independence. 

The entry of the United States in the Spanish–American War and its support for separatist Spaniards, changed the destiny of the island, which in 1898 came under American influence.

Current historical research tints Manichean positions developed by Marxist doctrine in Cuba, aimed to prove the inevitability of the revolutionary movement that started in 1868 with the Grito de Yara, and concluded a hundred years later with the seizure of power by Fidel Castro, offering a more balanced interpretation of the events leading to the cessation of Spanish influence in Cuba and Latin America.

After the death of José Ramón Morales, movement was taken up by a non-profit association called Autonomie Concertée de Cuba (ACC)  led by Ferrán Núñez a Cuban exiled in France. Also known as Cuban autonomous community movement (Spanish: Movimiento por la Reincorporación de Cuba a España como Comunidad Autónoma) the movement advocates Cuba becoming the 18th autonomous community of Spain.

A problem of nationality

The restoration of Spanish national origin for natives of Cuba, the Philippines, and Puerto Rico, dispossessed of Spanish nationality under Article IX of the Treaty of Paris a legitimate claim of current descendants of Spaniards living abroad. The new provisions for the acquisition of Spanish citizenship to the Sephardic Jews and the Law of Historical Memory, both adopted by the Socialist government of José Luis Rodríguez Zapatero in 2007 only restore nationality to a part of the Spanish residents outside of the peninsula, but could be extended to all descendants that request it. In that sense, according to Angel Capellán, General Counsel for the United States, it is essential to create a comprehensive national law that restores the right to Spanish citizenship to all who wish to reclaim it, also including representation in the Congress of Deputies. The Spanish Cuba citizens’ movement bases its current claims on this essential point.

On February 7, 2014, the then-current Spanish government (Gallardón, Margallo, Rajoy; PP) announced a controversial bill project in which it recognizes the right of Sephardi Jews to obtain the Spanish citizenship. Thus, it opened a legal way for Spanish descendants in former overseas territories to request Spanish citizenship as well.

References

External links

 Ecured. SINA. 
 Diario ABC, Madrid, 15/08/2009. . 
 Exiliados cubanos se movilizan en Facebook para conseguir que la Isla se convierta en una comunidad autónoma española. El Confidencial, 12/08/2009.
 Autonomie Concertée de Cuba, Journal Officiel, 18/08/2012

Cuba–Spain relations
Monarchist organizations
Non-profit organizations based in France
Organizations based in Miami
Organizations established in 2008
Opposition to Fidel Castro